Keroche Breweries  is a Kenyan brewer and alcoholic beverages manufacturer. Founded in 1997 by Tabitha Karanja and her husband as a fortified wine maker, the company has grown to be the second largest alcoholic beverages producer in Kenya. The company's headquarters is located in Naivasha, Kenya. The Karanja family are the company's majority shareholders as well as C-Suite executives. The company's flagship brand is Summit Lager. It also brews Summit Malt and KB Lager. The company also produces a range of wines under the Valley Wines brand, ready-to-drink vodkas under its Viena Ice brand and spirits including dry gin, whiskey, brandy and vodka under its Crescent brand.

History

Keroche Breweries was started in 1997 by Tabitha Karanja, then 32, and her husband, Joseph Karanja, at their family farm. They started with five employees and capital drawn from a hardware shop they owned. It was then called Keroche Industries Limited and produced fortified wines targeted at low income earners. With time, also ventured into making spirits, once again, targeted at low income earners. It was part of the local Kenyan alcoholic beverages companies that controversially packed spirits in cheaply priced sachets, leading to accusations of fueling alcoholism.  In 2004, sachets were banned in Kenya leading to a reduction in this market. Two years later, in 2007, taxes on locally made wine forced the company to diversify from fortified wines as well. It started manufacturing ready-to-drink vodka. A year later, in 2008, the company ventured into brewing beer, a section of the market then dominated by the Diageo owned East African Breweries Limited. During this period, its products mainstreamed from low income to generally accepted alcoholic beverages across the Kenyan Market and became a serious player in the beer market.

Keroche Breweries has weathered numerous tax and legal challenges over the years.

Milestones and awards

The brewing facility was part of a 2015, KSh 10 billion (US$100 million) investment, where Keroche Breweries increased its capacity tenfold to produce 600,000 bottle a day from a previous capacity of 80,000 bottles a day. This investment included a one million hecto-litre brewhouse that could produce up to 30 different brands. In 2020, Keroche introduced a sorghum based beer dubbed KB Lager. This becomes their third beer in the market after Summit Lager and Summit Malt.

At the 6th Annual Gathering of the African Leadership Network 2015 Summit that was held in Marrakesh,  Keroche Breweries was named Africa’s Best Growing Company. Its CEO, [Tabitha Karanja], has also won numerous awards including Africa Awards for Entrepreneurship (Transformational Business Award) 2015. She also received a Kenyan State honour from President [Mwai Kibaki] Moran of the Order of the Burning Spear (M.B.S.) Award.In 2014, she won the CNBC East Africa Businesswoman of the Year Award and the CNBC Africa Businesswoman of the Year Award. In 2016, she received the Global Inspirational Women Leadership award and was inducted to the 100 Global Women Leaders Hall of Fame.

Controversies and legal challenges

Kenya Bureau of Standards

In 2003, the Kenya Bureau of Standards (KeBS) refused to grant Keroche a standardization mark (permit) for its products. It accused Keroche of making substandard alcoholic drinks. Without the KeBS mark, Keroche would not have been possible to sell its products in Kenya. KeBS would in 2016 again seek to withdraw the permits from Keroche. This was after the President issued a crackdown order on illicit and substandard alcoholic products. Keroche, however, moved to court and won the case.

Kenya Revenue Authority
Keroche Breweries has had long-running battles with the Kenya Revenue Authority on tax. In 2015, the company was shutdown for two weeks over a backdated duty of about KSh 1 billion for the ready to drink Vienna Ice vodka. KRA ordered the company not to produce excisable goods, an essential shutdown as all alcoholic products are excisable. However, it would be re-opened after a court reversed the KRA order. In 2017, the company won a decade-long court battle against the tax man over a tax bill of KSh 1.1 billion (US$110 million).

In August 2019, Keroche Breweries CEO Tabitha Karanja and her husband, the company's chairman, Joseph, were arrested on charges of tax evasion of KSh 14 billion (US$140 million). They were accused of mis-declaring [excise] tax and [VAT] between 2015 and 2019. They were released on a cash bail of KSh 10 million for the CEO and KSh 2 million for her husband. The matters were however referred to the Tax Appeals Tribunal, with Keroche lodging six appeals. The dispute mainly revolved around the manufacture process of Vienna Ice ready-to-drink Vodka. The Brewer argued that Vienna Ice was not a separate product from its Crescent Vodka as all they did was to dilute it. They therefore paid excise on the vodka component of the drink rather than the full diluted product. KRA argued that as a separate product, it should have excise calculated on the total volume. The other issue in contention was the classification of its pineapple based wines. The brewer classified the wines under World Customs Organization HS Code 22.04 as a fortified wine. However KRA argued that 22.04, which attracts less duty, is for grapes-based wines only and the pineapple based wined should have been classified under HS Code 22.06, which covers others.  The tribunal ruled in favour of Kenya Revenue Authority on all the matters but faulted the tax authority for charging interest while the matter was in court. The matter is in appeal.

Sachets

Keroche, in its early days, allegedly sold alcohol in cheap sachets. These are controversially believed to have contributed to alcoholism in the central region of Kenya and rural Kenya, before their ban in 2004. The company has indicated that copycats infiltrated the market and copied their brands, leading to their move away from plastic bottles to using glass bottles. Critics have also noted that the companies products have since mainstreamed.

Competition with East African Breweries
The Diageo owned East Africa Breweries is the dominant player in the beer market in Kenya. The diversification of Keroche into beer making disrupted the market forcing EABL to issue two new beer brands targeted at low income earners in 2013. In 2020, EABL and Keroche Breweries became engaged in a court battle over the use of the brown Euro Bottle for selling beer. EABL engraves its name on beer bottles but Keroche does not. The contention is whether bottles engraved by EABL should be used exclusively for EABL products. Keroche has argued that they should be open for use since the bottles are used universally and EABL also uses Keroche bottles to package its beer.

References

1997 establishments in Kenya
Companies of Kenya
Food and drink companies of Kenya